Drosera omissa is a species of pygmy sundew from Western Australia.

References

Carnivorous plants of Australia
omissa
Caryophyllales of Australia